Kalpana Saroj is an Indian entrepreneur and a Tedx speaker. She is the Chairperson of Kamani Tubes in Mumbai, India.

Described as the original "Slumdog Millionaire", she  bought the distressed assets of Kamani Tubes Company and successfully steered the company back to profitability.

Early life
Saroj was born in 1961 in Roperkheda village in, Akola, Maharashtra, India, to a Marathi Buddhist family, the eldest of three daughters and two sons. Saroj's father served as a police constable at Repatkhed village in Akola. Kalpana Saroj was married at the age of 12 and lived in a slum in Mumbai with her husband's family. After suffering physical abuse at the hands of her husband's family members, she was rescued by her father, left her husband and returned to her village to live with her parents. She attempted suicide after being ostracized by the villagers.  At the age of 16, she moved back to Mumbai to live with her uncle. She started working in a garment factory to support her family. Using government loans for scheduled caste people, she successfully started a tailoring business and then a furniture store.

Entrepreneurial ventures
Kalpana Saroj started KS Film Production and produced her first movie which was dubbed in English, Telugu and Hindi. Khairalnji Movie is produced by Deelip Mhaske, Jyoti Reddy and Mannan Gore under Kalpana Saroj's banner.

She built up a successful real estate business and came to be known for her contacts and entrepreneurial skills. She was on the board of Kamani Tubes when it went into liquidation in 2001, and after taking over the company, she restructured it and brought it back to profit.

According to her own estimates, she has personal assets worth $112 million.

Personal life
Saroj is a Buddhist. She is inspired by and follows teachings of Dr. Ambedkar. In 1980, she remarried Samir Saroj at the age of 22, with whom she has a son, Amar Saroj (b. 1985), and a daughter, Seema Saroj (b. 1987). In 1989, her husband died, and Saroj inherited his steel cupboard manufacturing business.

Awards and recognition
Kalpana Saroj was awarded the Padma Shri for Trade and Industry in 2013.

She was appointed to the board of directors of Bhartiya Mahila Bank, a bank primarily for women, by the Government of India.

She also serves on the Board of Governors of Indian Institute of Management Bangalore.

See also
Dalit businesses

References

External links
Official Web Site
 Kalpana Saroj Motivational Stories In Telugu

Businesspeople from Mumbai
Recipients of the Padma Shri in trade and industry
Living people
Indian chairpersons of corporations
Indian social reformers
Indian women bankers
Indian bankers
20th-century Indian businesspeople
20th-century Buddhists
Indian Buddhists
1961 births
Businesswomen from Maharashtra
20th-century Indian businesswomen
21st-century Indian businesswomen
21st-century Buddhists
21st-century Indian businesspeople
Nari Shakti Puraskar winners